GRADE (Generic pre-R&D at IdeaSquare) is a CERN research programme. The programme was approved by the CERN Research Board in December 2015.

GRADE Research Programme

Reletated web sites and further reading
IdeaSquare
IdeaSquare and GRADE Advisory Board 
Challenge Based Innovation
CERN IdeaSquare Journal of Experimental Innovation

References

Particle experiments
GRADE
CERN facilities